Acharya Pratishtha (born Pratishtha Sharma) is an Indian Yoga guru, Kathak Guru and Performer, Author and former Diplomat. She is the Director of Mokshayatan Yog Sansthan.

Author

Acharya Pratishtha has written 5 books on Kathak and Yoga. Her first book was published “DIABETES, Why Die-a-bit-ease?” at the age of 25. She wrote first bilingual book on Bahasa Indonesia and English “Essential elements of kathak” Published by Indian Embassy in Indonesia,Ministry of External Affairs.

Personal life
Pratishtha Sharma works under name Acharya Pratishtha born in Saharanpur Uttar Pradesh. She is the daughter of Swami Dr.Bharat Bhushan (yogi). She has done graduation from Delhi University and post-graduation from Indira Kala Sangeet Vishwavidyalaya. She is married and have one daughter.

Career
Acharya Pratishtha is an Yoga and Kathak Dance Exponent. She is an expert of Indian culture and soft Diplomacy and has worked as the Director of World’s largest Indian Culture center of Government of India Situated at Mauritius under High Commission of India. She was also posted at Indian Culture Center at Embassy of India, Jakarta. She has given noted TV shows and written books on her subject. She is the member of several Indian Government committees of Yoga and culture.

Awards and Honors

International Ayurveda Samman - She was awarded with “International Ayurveda Samman” by Association of Ayurvedic Physician, GOM, Mauritus.

Dainik Jagran Samman for contribution in the field of Yoga and kathak.

Tejaswini Samman (Received from Vice President of India) by Doordarshan,Ministry of Information and Broadcasting (India).

Yoga Guru

She is working in the field of promoting and propagating Yoga Internationally and regularly involved in Government of India projects of Yoga. She has spoken on several topics and how yoga can be helpful in that. She is the member of Committee for Yoga Protocol on Diabetes formed by the Minister of Ayush,Government of India.

Kathak Guru and Exponent

She is an acknowledged Kathak dancer and has performed at several festivals in India and abroad.

Television Shows

Books

References

External links 
 Acharya Pratishtha Website
 Tejaswini with Acharya Pratishtha on DD News (Interview)

Living people
Indian yoga teachers
Kathak exponents
Indian Hindus
Delhi University alumni
1983 births